is a Japanese politician serving in the House of Representatives in the Diet (national legislature) as a member of the Democratic Party of Japan. A native of Shimizu, Shizuoka and graduate of Keio University he was elected for the first time in 1995 after an unsuccessful run in 1991.

References

External links
 Official website in Japanese.

Living people
1961 births
People from Shizuoka (city)
Democratic Party of Japan politicians
Members of the House of Representatives (Japan)
Keio University alumni
21st-century Japanese politicians